Ophiolatry is a Brazilian death metal band formed in 1998. The name was derived from a term meaning "the worship of serpents".

Biography
Ophiolatry  was formed in 1998 by Jhorge "Dog" Duarte, Antonio Cozta, Fabio Zperandio and Tiago Nunes. They recorded their first demo, Opposite Monarchy, in 1999, and also released a split on Mutilation Records with the band Ancestral Malediction. In 2000, Relapse Records included Opposite Monarchy on their compilation album Brazilian Assault, which was released in Europe and North America. After signing on the North American record label Evil Vengeance Records, they recorded their first full-length album, Anti-Evangelistic Process, in 2001. This album was mastered by Erik Rutan (Morbid Angel, Hate Eternal) and released in 2002. In 2003, the band did a 50-day tour of Europe after recording the new EP Misanchristianthropy. This EP was released in 2003, by US record label Deathgasm Records, as a split with Infernal Dominion. After releasing two more split albums in 2005 and 2006, the band signed on Forces of Satan Records, the Norwegian record label run by Gorgoroth guitarist and founder Infernus. Their latest full-length album, Transmutation was released in early 2008 through Forces of Satan Records and Regain Records. 2002's Anti-Evangelistic Process was also re-released in the summer that year.

Members

Former
Tiago Nunes - vocals (1998–2002)
Jhorge "Dog" Duarte - drums (1998–present)

Discography

Albums
Anti-Evangelistic Process (2002, re-released in 2008)
Transmutation (2008)

Demos
Opposite Monarchy (demo) (1999)

Split albums
Opposite Monarchy (with Ancestral Malediction) (1999)
Misanchristianthropy (with Infernal Dominion) (2004)
Impaling the Christian Race (with Abhorrence) (2005)
Satancore (with Sacramental Blood) (2006)

Compilation albums
Brazilian Assault (2000)

References

External links
Official MySpace profile

Brazilian death metal musical groups
Forces of Satan Records artists
Musical groups established in 1998
Brazilian musical trios
1998 establishments in Brazil